Palais Modena is a palace in Vienna, Austria. It was built and owned by the Habsburgs of the Modenese branch of the family.

Today it houses offices of the Federal Ministry of the Interior.

External links

Modena